Santa Helena is a municipality in the state of Santa Catarina in the South region of Brazil.

See also
List of municipalities in Santa Catarina

References

Populated places established in 1992
Municipalities in Santa Catarina (state)